Petteri Silván (born 21 October 1972) is a Finnish enduro rider and a five-time World Enduro Champion (including the overall world championship title in 1999). He is also a four-time winner of the International Six Days Enduro (ISDE) World Trophy with Team Finland.

Silván won the Finnish rounds of the World Enduro Championship in 1991, which earned him a factory team contract with Husqvarna for the following season. Riding in the 125 cc world championship for Husqvarna, he finished runner-up to Paul Edmondson in 1994 and then won his first world title in 1995. After an injury-filled 1996 season, Silván switched to Gas Gas and the 250 cc class, and won his second title in 1999. In 2000, he returned to Husqvarna and the smaller class, finishing second to KTM's dominant Juha Salminen who won all the ten rounds of the season. In the following years, he won his third and fourth world championship titles with Husqvarna before moving to KTM. Silván retired from the World Enduro Championship after the 2005 season, and has since competed in the Finnish national championship.

Career summary

ISDE

External links
Official website

1972 births
Living people
Finnish motorcycle racers
Enduro riders